Mareček, feminine: Marečková, is a Czech surname. Notable people with the surname include:

 Eva Marečková (born 1964), Slovak gymnast
 Lukáš Mareček (born 1990), Czech footballer
 Otakar Mareček (1943–2020), Czech rower
 Vlastislav Mareček (1966–2007), Czech footballer and manager

Czech-language surnames